General elections were held in Tonga on 24 and 25 January 1996 to elect members of the Legislative Assembly of Tonga. The nobles were elected on 24 January and the nine people's representatives on 25 January. A total of 61 candidates ran for the latter. Voter turnout was 56.1%.

Results

Elected members

References

Tonga
1996 in Tonga
Elections in Tonga
January 1996 events in Oceania